Edward Collins (1882–1955) was an English footballer who played as a defender for Bilston United, Birmingham Veritas, Wolverhampton Wanderers, Sunbeam Motors, Newport County, and Hednesford Town.

Career
Collins played for Bilston United, Birmingham Veritas, and Wolverhampton Wanderers. He played for Wolves in the 1908 FA Cup Final as they beat Newcastle United 3–1 at Crystal Palace. He joined Port Vale as a guest in September 1916, and made his debut at right-back in a 0–0 draw with Liverpool at the Athletic Ground in a Football League, Lancashire Regional Section match on 9 September. He became a regular in the first team, and played in a 2–2 home draw with Bury two weeks later despite having worked through the previous night until 6 am in Wolverhampton. He left Port Vale in September 1917, and later played for Sunbeam Motors, Newport County, and Hednesford Town. He died in 1955.

Career statistics
Source:

Honours
Wolverhampton Wanderers
FA Cup: 1908

References

1882 births
1955 deaths
Footballers from Wolverhampton
English footballers
Association football defenders
Bilston Town F.C. players
Wolverhampton Wanderers F.C. players
Newport County A.F.C. players
Hednesford Town F.C. players
English Football League players
Port Vale F.C. wartime guest players
FA Cup Final players